Alucita xanthosticta is a species of moth of the family Alucitidae. It is found in Australia.

External links

Australian Faunal Directory

Moths of Australia
Alucitidae
Moths described in 1923